Liu Chuang (刘窗）) is a Chinese artist who currently lives and works in Beijing. He was born in 1979 and graduated from Hubei Institute of Fine Arts in 2001.
His work, "Buying Everything on You" was featured in The Generational: Younger Than Jesus exhibition that took place at the New Museum in 2009.  The show was curated by Massimiliano Gioni. As part of an ongoing project, "Buying Everything on You" was also on view at Frieze New York 2013, and was presented by the Shanghai-based gallery Leo Xu Projects.

Exhibitions

Solo exhibitions 
2015

Live Remnants, Magician Space, Beijing

Segmented Landscape, K11 Wuhan, Wuhan

2014

Love Story, Taikang Art Space, Beijing

Dancing Partners, Kunsthall Stavanger, Stavanger, Norway

Love Story, Salon 94 Freemans, NYC

2012                   

Liu Chuang: Works #16-21, Leo Xu Projects, Shanghai, China

2010

51m2 13# Liu Chuang, Taikang Space, Beijing, China

Group exhibitions

2012

Until the End of The World, Tang Contemporary Art Beijing, Beijing, China

La Chambre Claire, Taikang Space, Beijing, China

Boy: A Contemporary Portrait, Leo Xu Projects, Shanghai, China

2011

51 m2 16 Emerging Chinese Artists, Taikang space, Beijing, China

Image-History-Existence, Taikang Art Collection, National Art Museum Of China, Beijing, China

CAFAM Biennale: Super-organism, CAFA Art Museum, Beijing, China

Moving Image In China:1988-2011, Minsheng Art Museum, Shanghai, China

Video Wednesdays I, Gallery Espace, Lalit Kala Akadem, New Delhi, India

2010                   

China Power Station, Pinacoteca Giovanni e Marella Agnelli, Turin, Italy

Studies & Theory, Kwadrat, Berlin, Germany

Trailer, Boers-Li Galler, Beijing, China

2009

The Generational: Younger Than Jesus, New Museum of Contemporary Art, New York, NY, US

Permanent Migrant, Inheritance – Shenzhen, Shenzhen, China

Just Around the Corner, Arrow Factory, Beijing, China

2008

Forever Young, Anne+ art project, Paris, France

Insomnia, BizArt Art Center, Shanghai, China

Poznan Mediations International Biennale Of Contemporary art, Poznan, Poland

Terminu, para/site art space, Hong Kong

There Is No Story To Tell, Tangren Gallery, Beijing, China

Homesickness, T Space, Beijing, China

Delirious Beijing, PKM Gallery, Beijing, China

Realms Of Myth, Shanghai Gallery Of Art, Shanghai, China

2007

China Power Station: Part 2, Astrup Fearnley Museum of Modern Art, Oslo, Norway

In Shenzhen, J&Z Gallery, Shenzhen, China

Slash Fiction, Gasworks, London, UK

2005

The 2nd Triennial of Chinese Art: Archaeology Of the Future, Nanjing, China

2004                   

Any Place Any Art, Immigration, Utopia, Macedonian Museum of Contemporary Art, Thessaloniki, Greece

2003

The Fifth System: Public Art in the Age of Post-Planning, The 5th Shenzhen International Public Art Exhibition, Shenzhen, China

References

Chinese contemporary artists
1979 births
Living people